Trust Your Heart is an album by Judy Collins, released in 1987 by Gold Castle. The album liner notes credit Judy Collins with "overall production". It was released simultaneously with her autobiography of the same name. It is composed of seven of the 16 songs from an album she made for the British label, Telstar, titled Amazing Grace. In addition, she recorded two original songs, Trust Your Heart, and The Life You Dream, as well as a cover of Moonfall from the 1985 Broadway musical, Drood, aka "The Mystery of Edwin Drood".

Track listing 
 "Trust Your Heart" (Judy Collins) – 3:21
 "Amazing Grace" (John Newton) – 3:50
 "Jerusalem" (William Blake, Hubert Parry) – 2:19
 "Day by Day (Godspell)" (Stephen Schwartz, John-Michael Tebelak) – 3:11
 "The Life You Dream" (Judy Collins) – 5:49
 "The Rose" (Amanda McBroom) – 5:04
 "Moonfall" (Rupert Holmes) – 3:30
 "Morning Has Broken" (Eleanor Farjeon, Cat Stevens) – 2:48
 "When a Child is Born" (Fred Jay (translator), Ciro Dammicco (alias Zacar)) – 3:23
 "When You Wish Upon a Star" (Leigh Harline, Ned Washington) – 2:45

Personnel
Judy Collins  – vocals, guitar, keyboards, background vocals
Warren Odze - drums, percussion
Shelton Becton - Piano, vocals
Lou Volpe - Guitar
Zev Katz - bass

Production
Ted Jensen at Sterling Sound, NYC - mastering

References

External links section 
Judy Collins official website
Warren Odze discography at Artist Direct
Warren Odze discography Discogs
Shelton Becton official website
Lou Volpe official website
Zev Katz bio
Zev Katz history with Roxy Music

Judy Collins albums
1987 albums